In cell biology, Meiomitosis is an aberrant cellular division pathway that combines normal mitosis pathways with ectopically expressed meiotic machinery resulting in genomic instability.

Description 
Meiotic pathways are normally restricted to germ cells. Meiotic proteins drive double stranded DNA breaks, chiasma formation, sister chromatid adhesion and rearrange the spindle apparatus.  

During meiosis, there are 2 sets of cell divisions, the second division is similar to mitosis in that sister chromatids are directly separated.  However, in the first meiotic division the sister chromatids are held together by cohesins and segregated from their homologous pair of cohesion bound sister chromatids after resolution of recombination crossover points (chiasma) between the homologous pairs.  The collision of mitosis and meiosis (first division) pathways could cause abnormal chiasma formation, abnormal cohesion expression, and mitotic/meiotic spindle defects that could result in insertions, deletions, abnormal segregation, DNA bridging, and potentially failure of cell division altogether resulting in polyploidy.

Role in cancer
Meiotic proteins have been noted to be expressed in cancer particularly melanoma and lymphoma. In cutaneous T-cell lymphoma meiosis proteins have been shown to be regulated with the cell cycle.  Lymphoma cell lines have also been noted to up-regulate meiosis specific genes with irradiation and a correlation with mitotic arrest and polyploidy has been noted.  The overall role of meiomitosis in cancer development and evolution has yet to be determined.

References

Sources
 
 

Cell cycle